John Reardon (born 1975) is an actor.

John Reardon may also refer to:

Beans Reardon (John Reardon, 1897–1984), baseball umpire
John Reardon (baritone) (1930–1988), opera baritone
John Reardon (banker), banker who evacuated people in Saigon towards the end of the Vietnam War